The Administrator of the Pitcairn Islands is the de facto Chair of the Island Council. The officeholder represents the interests of the Governor. 

As a British overseas territory the head of state is Charles III, with the Governor of the Pitcairn Islands appointed by the British government to act as his local representative. However, as the Governor of the Pitcairn Islands is also the British High Commissioner to New Zealand and Samoa, an Administrator is appointed as the Governor's representative on the island.

However, Pitcairn is largely autonomous, and most power is exercised not by officials appointed by the British government, but rather by the locally elected Mayor and Island Council.

The first and inaugural Administrator is His Honour Alan Richmond, who took up the office in November 2014.
In August 2018 Nicholas Kennedy become the second Administrator.

List of administrators of the Pitcairn Islands

References

External links
Government of the Pitcairn Islands
Pitcairn Islands:Written question - 212288

Politics of the Pitcairn Islands